The R761 road is a regional road in County Wicklow (except for the northernmost 200m) in Ireland. From its junction with the M11 and R119 in Bray it takes a southerly route to its junction with the R750 in the village of Rathnew, on the outskirts of Wicklow, where it terminates. 

En route it passes through Bray, Greystones, Kilcoole and Newcastle.

See also
Roads in Ireland
National primary road

References
Roads Act 1993 (Classification of Regional Roads) Order 2006 – Department of Transport

Regional roads in the Republic of Ireland
Roads in County Dublin
Roads in County Wicklow